Sale College is a public day school located in Sale, in the state of Victoria, Australia. It is a high school broken up into two campuses. The Mac campus(senior) and guthridge campus (junior).

History 
It was formed in 1996 through the merger of Sale High School and Sale Technical School.

Sale Technical School 
The former Sale Technical School was opened in 1885 and continued to operate until 1996.

Facilities

Guthridge Campus 
The Guthridge campus is the larger of the school's two campuses. This campus is used primarily for teaching years 7 to 9 but also contains two sports ovals and a performing arts center.

Macalister Campus 
The Macalister campus is used primarily for teaching years 10 to 12. It incorporates the Sale Public Library within its bounds.

Alumni 
 Jason Gram, Australian rules footballer with the St Kilda Football Club
 Shane Birss, Australian rules footballer with the Western Bulldogs & St Kilda Football Clubs

References 

Public high schools in Victoria (Australia)
Sale, Victoria